Bishop Hartley High School is a private, Catholic high school located in Columbus, Ohio. The school is part of the Roman Catholic Diocese of Columbus, and serves the East side of Columbus. It is a coeducational high school and typically has an enrollment between 600 and 700 students. The school bases itself upon 6 pillars: faith, service, preparation, spirit, community, and leadership.

Bishop Hartley High School has been noted for its technology program, as students are provided with an array of devices to facilitate learning. Also, each classroom is equipped with a SMART board and most homework is transferred online.

History
Bishop Ready announced the plans to build a new Catholic High school in Columbus in 1954, and it was decided it would be named in memory of Bishop James J. Hartley, the fourth Bishop of Columbus. The sisters of Notre Dame de Namur- the city's first order of teaching nuns- agreed to staff the school under the direction of the Diocese of Columbus. Bishop Ready made frequent trips to the site to inspect the building progress. At the time of his death on May 2, 1957, the exterior construction work had been completed and the interior work was well underway. Although Bishop Ready did not have the pleasure of seeing his work completed, he had the satisfaction of knowing that the second unit in the high school expansion program was accomplished and that the first class had actually enrolled.

Bishop Edward G. Hettinger, consecrated the altar in the school chapel and offered the first Mass on Wednesday, September 11, 1957. The next day, September 12, the school was officially opened and Bishop Hartley High School welcomed its initial class of 177 ninth grade pupils.

Academics
Bishop Hartley's college preparatory graduating requirements are: 4 years of Religion, English, and Electives (2 or more Foreign Language); 3 years of Mathematics, Science, and Social Studies; 1 year of Health and Art. Many Advanced Placement (AP) classes are offered in the curriculum including the areas of Biology, Calculus, and English. College level Calculus II and Statistics is also offered, as is PSEO at Ohio State, Columbus State, Franklin, and Ohio Dominican.

Nearly 92% of Hartley graduates attend a two or four-year program.

House System
To promote pastoral care, students are divided into 6 Houses, each with about 120 students. The houses are divided into 6 mentor groups of 20 students (5 from each class) that meet every day. House polos are worn every Wednesday to show house pride, and lanyards with school IDs are worn on a daily basis. A House Cup is awarded at the end of the year based on a point system. The Houses are named after previous Diocese of Columbus High Schools.

Athletics
The Hartley Hawks are known for their excellent athletic program. Sports available for women include volleyball, track and field, basketball, soccer, swimming and diving, cheer leading, field hockey, lacrosse, cross country, softball, and bowling. Sports for the men include wrestling, basketball, track and field, swimming and diving, football, soccer, tennis, golf, bowling, cross country, and baseball. The Hawks also have a coed Ultimate Frisbee team, which competed at the state level in 2010.

The school has just finished work on an auxiliary gym. The Rob Telersiki and Barbra Casson  (TAC) was finished in 2019 and acts as a gym, weight room, and student center. They replaced the track in the summer of 2008, and in the summer of 2009 installed an artificial turf field and LED scoreboard. In 2010, new home bleachers were added, and the old home bleachers were moved to the visiting side. The newly completed entry way, St. Gabriel's Gate, has a plaque bearing homage to Jack Ryan himself. Jack Ryan was voted by the Columbus Dispatch newspaper as the number one area high school coach of the twentieth century, and is in the Ohio High School Coaches Hall of Fame for three sports. They have also recently finished a new concession building, and a new locker room and bathroom facility.

A complete virtual tour of the upgrades and school is offered on the official Bishop Hartley High School website.

State Championships

 Baseball – 1996
 Football – 1986, 2010, 2015, 2016
 Boys Track and Field – 1985, 1986, 1991
 Girls Track and Field – 1984, 1986, 1988, 2009, 2011
 Girls Basketball – 1976, 1978, 2000
 Girls Volleyball – 2011

References

External links
School Website

Roman Catholic Diocese of Columbus
High schools in Columbus, Ohio
Catholic secondary schools in Ohio
Educational institutions established in 1957
1957 establishments in Ohio